Ogresta is a surname. Notable people with the surname include:

Željka Ogresta (born 1963), Croatian journalist and television presenter
Zrinko Ogresta (born 1958), Croatian screenwriter and film director

Croatian surnames